Constantin Ignat (born November 18, 1958) is a Romanian former footballer and head coach.

Career 
Ignat played in the Divizia A in 1976 with FC Farul Constanța. In 1980, he played with FC Argeș Pitești, and featured in the 1980–81 UEFA Cup, and 1981–82 UEFA Cup. In 1992, he played abroad in the Canadian Soccer League with Winnipeg Fury. In his debut season he assisted the Fury in securing the Mita Cup after defeating Vancouver 86ers. The following season he played with Winnipeg in the Canadian National Soccer League.

International career 
Ignat played with the Romania national under-19 football team in 1976, and with the Romania national under-21 football team in 1977.

Managerial career 
Ignat became one of the founders of WSA Winnipeg in 2001, and entered the franchise into the USL Premier Development League in 2011. He also served as the team's assistant coach under head coach Eduardo Badescu.

References 

1958 births
Living people
Romanian footballers
Romanian expatriate footballers
Romanian football managers
FCV Farul Constanța players
FC Argeș Pitești players
Winnipeg Fury players
Liga I players
Canadian Soccer League (1987–1992) players
Canadian National Soccer League players
Association footballers not categorized by position
Romanian expatriate sportspeople in Canada
Expatriate soccer players in Canada
Sportspeople from Constanța